The Galisteo Pass is a historic mountain pass in New Mexico in the United States.

Location
The pass is located in the Manzano Mountains, near the Pecos Pueblo, New Mexico, USA.

Historical significance
For Native Americans, the pass enabled them to travel from the pueblos to the Southern Plains. It acted as a trading route for them.

In the 1590s, Spanish conquistador Juan de Oñate went through the pass.

During the Mexican–American War of 1846-1848, General Manuel Armijo went through the pass.

References

Geography of New Mexico